NGC 22 is a spiral galaxy located in the Pegasus constellation. It was discovered in 1883 by Édouard Stephan.

References

External links
 
 

Galaxies discovered in 1883
0022
Unbarred spiral galaxies
Pegasus (constellation)
00086
000690
18831002